Víctor Marrero Padilla, known as "El Búho", is a Puerto Rican politician and former Senator. He was a member of the Senate of Puerto Rico from 1993 until his conviction from corruption in 2000.

Biography

Víctor Marrero was first elected to the Senate of Puerto Rico at the 1992 general elections and was reelected in 1996.

In 2000, Marrero was accused of illegally appropriating of $600 destined for an air conditioner for a medical clinic at the Ramón Marín Sola housing project in Arecibo. He was tried and found guilty by a jury on October 11, 2000 with a verdict of 11-1.

The family of Marrero maintain his innocence, but haven't been able to get a new trial for him.

See also

Senate of Puerto Rico

References

Members of the Senate of Puerto Rico
People from Morovis, Puerto Rico
New Progressive Party (Puerto Rico) politicians
Living people
Puerto Rico politicians convicted of crimes
Year of birth missing (living people)